Human Fertility is one of two academic journals with this title.  Both journals deal with topics regarding human reproduction.  This journal is published by the British Fertility Society.

Publications established in 1998
Obstetrics and gynaecology journals
Taylor & Francis academic journals